Andre Engelbrecht (born 15 November 1991) is a South African-born Namibian former first-class cricketer.

Engelbrecht was member of the Namibia Under-19 squad for the 2012 Under-19 Cricket World Cup, making four appearances in the tournament. Prior to playing in the Under-19 World Cup, Engelbrecht made two appearances in first-class cricket for the Namibian senior team against Northerns and Gauteng in the 2011–12 CSA 3-Day Cup. In October 2011, he played in two Twenty20 matches against Scotland, before making a further six appearances in the same season in the CSA Provincial T20 Cup. He took 5 wickets in his eight Twenty20 appearances, at an average of 30.60 and best figures of 2 for 14.

References

External links

1991 births
Living people
Namibian cricketers